Miquel Howard Hugh Scarlett (born 27 September 2000) is a professional footballer who plays as a right back for National League South club Eastbourne Borough. Born in England, he represents Guyana national football team internationally.

Scarlett signed a professional contract with Gillingham in summer 2019 and had a work experience loan at Sheppey United. However, his contract was cancelled in September 2019 and he went on to join Colchester United.

Club career
Born in Lambeth, London, Scarlett signed his first professional contract with Gillingham in summer 2019. He made his professional debut for Gillingham on 4 September 2018 in their 4–0 EFL Trophy defeat to Portsmouth, coming on as a substitute for Alex Lacey after 80 minutes.

In January 2019, Scarlett was sent out on work experience loan to Sheppey United, where he went on to make seven first-team appearances.

On 2 September 2019, Gillingham announced that Scarlett's contract with the club had been cancelled. He later signed for Colchester United, first featuring for their under-23 side in November 2019.

Scarlett made his Colchester United debut on 5 September 2020, starting in their 3–1 EFL Cup defeat to Reading. He then made his English Football League debut in Colchester's 1–1 draw at Walsall on 10 October.

Colchester announced that Scarlett was one of seven under-23 players who had their contract terminated by mutual consent on 1 February 2021.

International career
Born in England, Miquel is of Guyanese descent. He made his debut for Guyana national football team on 25 March 2021 in a World Cup qualifier against Trinidad and Tobago.

Career statistics

Club

International

References

External links

2000 births
Living people
Footballers from Lambeth
English footballers
English people of Guyanese descent
Guyanese footballers
Guyana international footballers
Association football fullbacks
Association football midfielders
Gillingham F.C. players
Sheppey United F.C. players
Colchester United F.C. players
Eastbourne Borough F.C. players
English Football League players
Black British sportspeople